The Larry MacPhail Award was presented annually from 1966 to 2019 by Minor League Baseball to recognize "a club that demonstrates outstanding and creative marketing and promotional efforts within its community, its ballpark (including non-game day events), in media, and other promotional materials". The award was named in honor of Baseball Hall of Fame member Larry MacPhail, a baseball executive who was considered an innovator in the sport, particularly in the areas of marketing and promotion. It was usually presented during baseball's Winter Meetings.

No award was given in 2020 after the cancellation of the minor league season due to the COVID-19 pandemic. In 2021, Major League Baseball assumed control of the minor leagues and the honor was discontinued. The Golden Bobblehead Awards, previously issued at the annual Minor League Baseball Innovators Summit, began to be issued at the Winter Meetings in place of the Larry MacPhail Award to recognize the top promotional efforts in the minors.

Forty-six teams won the Larry MacPhail Award. The Columbus Clippers, El Paso Diablos, and Nashville Sounds each won the award on three occasions, more than any other teams, followed by the Charleston RiverDogs, Hawaii Islanders, Reading Phillies, Richmond Braves, and Rochester Red Wings, who each won the award twice. International League teams won the award eight times, more than any other league, followed by the Eastern League, Pacific Coast League, Southern League, and Texas League (6); the American Association, Florida State League, and Midwest League (4); the Pioneer League and South Atlantic League (3); the California League and New York–Penn League (2); and the Carolina League, Northwestern League, and Western Carolinas League (1). Eighteen teams competed at the Triple-A and Double-A classification levels, more than any other classes, followed by Class A (10); Class A-Advanced (5); and Class A Short Season and Rookie (3).

Winners

References
Specific

General

Minor league baseball trophies and awards
Awards established in 1966
Awards disestablished in 2021